Robert J. Houbregs (March 12, 1932 – May 28, 2014) was a Canadian professional basketball player. Houbregs was inducted into the Naismith Basketball Hall of Fame in 1987.

Basketball career
A 6-foot 8-inch, 225-pound forward-centre, from Queen Anne High School in Seattle, Washington, Houbregs played for the University of Washington Huskies  from 1949 to 1953 (his family moved to Seattle from Vancouver, British Columbia when he was a child). In 1952, Houbregs was a Second Team Consensus All-America selection. In 1953, as a senior, he was named NCAA Player of the Year, was a Consensus All-America selection, helped lead the University of Washington to the Final Four, and was named to the All-Tournament team after averaging 34.8 points per game in the post-season.

Houbregs was drafted by the NBA's Milwaukee Hawks with the second overall pick in 1953 and played five seasons (1953–1958) in the NBA with four teams: the Hawks, the Baltimore Bullets, the Boston Celtics, and the Fort Wayne (later Detroit) Pistons. Houbregs' career scoring average was 9.3 points per game.

Houbregs served as general manager of the Seattle SuperSonics from 1970 to 1973.

Personal life
Houbregs' father John was a minor league ice hockey player who moved to Seattle in 1934/35 with his family in order to play for the Seattle Sea Hawks of the North West Hockey League. Houbregs was a member of Alpha Sigma Phi fraternity.

Houbregs was elected to the Naismith Basketball Hall of Fame in 1987.

In 2000, Houbregs was inducted into the Canadian Basketball Hall of Fame for his significant contributions to the sport as a player.

Houbergs died on May 28, 2014.

References

External links
Hoophall.com
Career Statistics
Where Are They Now: Bob Houbregs

1932 births
2014 deaths
All-American college men's basketball players
American men's basketball players
Baltimore Bullets (1944–1954) players
Basketball people from British Columbia
Boston Celtics players
Canadian expatriate basketball people in the United States
Canadian men's basketball players
Canadian people of Dutch descent
Centers (basketball)
Detroit Pistons players
Fort Wayne Pistons players
Forwards (basketball)
Milwaukee Hawks draft picks
Milwaukee Hawks players
Naismith Memorial Basketball Hall of Fame inductees
National Basketball Association players from Canada
Seattle SuperSonics general managers
Basketball players from Vancouver
Washington Huskies men's basketball players
Basketball players from Seattle